Natural freshwater lakes in Australia are rare due to the general absence of glacial and tectonic activity in Australia.

Types 
Most lakes in Australia fall within one of five categories. Excluding lakes and lagoons created by man-made dams for water storage and other purposes, one can identify the following:
 coastal lakes and lagoons including perched lakes;
 natural freshwater inland lakes, often ephemeral and some part of wetland or swamp areas;
 the Main Range containing mainland Australia's five glacial lakes. In Tasmania, due to glaciation, there are a large number of natural freshwater lakes on the central plateau, many of which have been enlarged or modified by hydro-electric developments;
 predominantly dry, salt lakes in the flat desert regions of the country lacking organised drainage; and
 lakes created in volcanic remnants.

List of lakes and lagoons by state and territory

Australian Antarctic Territory 

The following is a list of prominent natural lakes and lagoons in the sector of Antarctica claimed by Australia as the Australian Antarctic Territory:

Australian Capital Territory 

In the Australian Capital Territory there are no prominent naturally-formed lakes and lagoons.
Artificial lakes include Bendora Dam, Cotter Dam, Corin Dam, Lake Burley Griffin, Lake Ginninderra, Lake Tuggeranong, and Stranger Pond.

New South Wales 

The following is a list of prominent natural lakes and lagoons in New South Wales:

Northern Territory 

The following is a list of prominent natural lakes and lagoons in the Northern Territory:

Queensland 

The following is a list of prominent natural lakes and lagoons in Queensland:

South Australia 

The following is a list of prominent natural lakes and lagoons in South Australia:

Tasmania 

The following is a list of prominent natural lakes and lagoons in Tasmania:

Victoria 

The following is a list of prominent natural lakes and lagoons in Victoria.

Western Australia 

The following is a list of prominent natural lakes and lagoons in Western Australia:

See also 
 List of reservoirs and dams in Australia

References

External links